University Challenge is a long-running New Zealand television quiz show, running originally from 1976 to 1989 before its revival in 2014 after a 25-year hiatus. The format was based on the British show of the same name, which was itself based on the American College Bowl. The 2014–2017 series were produced by Cue TV in Invercargill.

History

At its inception in 1976, University Challenge was hosted by Peter Sinclair, though he was briefly dropped in the late 1970s and replaced by University of Otago lecturer Charles Higham. Sinclair returned after just two seasons, and continued in this capacity until the show went into hiatus in 1989. The first series was filmed in the Union Hall, in Otago University's student union building. Later series were filmed in TVNZ's Dunedin studio. It was sponsored by the BNZ, who provided prizes for some of the series. For example, one year, they gave each member of the winning team "an Apple Macintosh computer system, plus a BNZ campus pack account with a $500 credit balance". Ten episodes were aired each year, with the exception of the first season, when there were nine. Most seasons were broadcast on TVNZ channel TV One; those that were not screened on its partner channel TV2. When TVNZ's Dunedin studio was closed and TVNZ moved premises to Auckland, they decided to drop the show.

In July 2014, 25 years after TVNZ stopped producing University Challenge, Cue TV revived the show with station owner Tom Conroy as host. Some of the science questions were replaced with more populist material to enable greater involvement from the audience at home. It began airing on Prime in November 2014.

Series overview

Format 

As with the British show, "starter" questions are answered individually "on the buzzer", and are worth 10 points. The team answering a starter correctly gets a set of "bonus" questions worth a potential fifteen points, over which they can confer. In the last few series before the show's hiatus, a "jackpot bonus" was also available once per game, signalled by a bell. In that, each part of the bonus was worth five points, but getting all three parts right doubled the value of the question to 30 points.

An incorrect interruption of a starter results in a five-point penalty. The pace of questioning gradually increases through the show, becoming almost frantic in the last minute or so before the "gong" which signals the end of the game. In the event of a tied score at the sound of the gong, a "sudden death" question is to be asked (although in practice this has never occurred). In this circumstance the first team to answer correctly would be deemed the winner, with the process repeated until one of the teams answers correctly.

The format of the competition for its original run – with the exception of the debut season – was seven first-round matches, with each of the teams competing twice (having been randomly drawn against their opponents). Two semi-finals between the highest points-scorers followed, after which there was a single final match. In the first season, the first round consisted of three knockout heats, the seventh team then competing with the highest-scoring losing side for the last semi-final position. Unlike later series, the final in this series was staged over three legs.

For series 15, the competition was in a round-robin format. From series 16, the teams were divided into two pools.

Teams consist of four members, each team representing a New Zealand university. In the revived series, each team also has a reserve member. All six of the universities in New Zealand at the time competed (Auckland, Canterbury, Massey, Otago, Victoria and Waikato), along with a seventh team, representing Lincoln College (now Lincoln University). From series 15, the Auckland University of Technology also competes.

During the original run of 14 series, shows were half an hour in length, with question time being approximately 27 minutes during the first 13 seasons, and 21 minutes during the last season (the show was reduced to 25 minutes in length for this season). The show would occupy a mid-evening spot, generally around 8pm. This same spot was also occupied by the annual quiz series Mastermind, also hosted by Peter Sinclair, with University Challenge commencing one week after the Mastermind final.

The show is broadcast in a split screen format, which led to a widespread rumour in the 1980s that the set was constructed so that one team was seated immediately above the other.

Notable contestants
Several team members from University Challenge have gone on to make a name for themselves in other fields, among them:
from the University of Auckland
Charles Chauvel, MP
Annette Morgan, winner of the New Zealand version of Mastermind in 1991
from the University of Canterbury
Vicki Hyde ( Spong), science writer
Jolisa Gracewood ( Wood), journalist
from the University of Otago
Hamish McDouall, winner of the New Zealand version of Mastermind, political candidate
Bruce Russell, musician
Prudence Scott, Rhodes scholar
Kathryn Tyrie, musician
Mark Allan, winner of the New Zealand version of Mastermind

Original run, 1976–1989

Series 1
The first series was filmed in Dunedin and screened on TV One in 1976. Unlike other series, it consisted of four knockout heats (the highest-scoring loser of the first three heats competed again, against the seventh university), and the final was held over three legs. The series was hosted by Peter Sinclair and produced by Wayne Cameron. The University of Otago won the series, defeating the University of Canterbury in the finals.

Series 2
The second series was filmed in Dunedin in August 1977 and screened later in the same year on TV One. The University of Otago won the series, defeating Massey University in the finals.

Series 3
The third series was filmed in Dunedin on 18–21 August 1978 and screened later in the same year on TV One. The series was the first one to be presented by Richard Higham. The University of Otago won the series, defeating Victoria University of Wellington in the finals.

Series 4
The fourth series was filmed in Dunedin in August 1979 and screened later in the same year on TV One. The University of Canterbury won the series, defeating the University of Auckland in the finals.

Series 5
The fifth series was filmed in Dunedin in August 1980 and screened later in the same year on TV One. Peter Sinclair returned as host. The University of Otago won the series, defeating Victoria University of Wellington in the finals.

Series 6
The sixth series was filmed in Dunedin in August 1981 and screened later in the same year. Unlike previous series, the 1981 edition screened on TV One's sister channel, TV2. The series was produced by Max Cryer. The University of Canterbury won the series, defeating the University of Otago in the finals.

Series 7
The seventh series was filmed in Dunedin in August 1982 and screened later in the same year on TV2. Massey University won the series, defeating the University of Canterbury in the finals.

Series 8
The eighth was filmed in Dunedin in August 1983, and returned to TV One, screening on Sundays later in the same year. Unusually, each university won one and lost one of their heats. This was the closest of all the original run of series, with three games decided by just five points. The final was low-scoring, due in part to the final being "Christmas themed" (for broadcast just prior to Christmas), something that none of the teams had prepared for or were aware of prior to filming. Victoria University of Wellington won the series, defeating the University of Auckland in the finals.

Series 9
The ninth series was filmed in Dunedin on 17–19 August 1984 and screened towards the end of the same year on TV One. The series was hosted by Peter Sinclair with booth announcer Hal Weston. The series was directed by Brian Stewart and produced by Derek Wooster. The University of Otago won the series, defeating the University of Auckland in the finals.

Series 10
The tenth series was filmed in Dunedin in August 1985 and screened later in the same year on TV One. The University of Auckland won the series, defeating the University of Canterbury in the finals.

Series 11
The eleventh series was filmed in Dunedin in August 1986 and screened between September and November on TV One. The series was presented by Peter Sinclair with John Jones replacing Hal Weston as booth announcer. The series was directed by Brian Stewart. The University of Otago won the series, defeating the University of Waikato in the finals.

Series 12
The twelfth series was filmed in Dunedin on 19–21 August 1987 and screened towards the end of the same year on TV One. This series of the contest was unusual in that every one of the competing sides won one and lost one heat. The series was presented by Peter Sinclair with John Jones as booth announcer, and was produced and directed by Brian Stewart. Uniquely among the original run of the show, there was a two-week gap between the broadcasting of two heats, to allow for a television special to be played on 25 October. The University of Auckland won the series, defeating the University of Waikato in the finals.

Series 13
The thirteenth series was filmed in Dunedin in August 1988 and screened towards the end of the same year on TV One. The series was presented by Peter Sinclair with John Jones as booth announcer, and was produced and directed by Brian Stewart. The University of Canterbury won the series, defeating the University of Waikato in the finals.

Series 14
The fourteenth and final series of the show's original run was filmed in Dunedin in August 1989 and screened towards the end of the same year on TV One. Episodes were 25 minutes in length, five minutes shorter than in previous series. The series was presented by Peter Sinclair with John Jones as booth announcer, and was produced and directed by Brian Stewart. The University of Waikato won the series, defeating the University of Auckland in the finals. Each member of the winning team won a Macintosh Classic. One still remains in the Waikato Students' Union Office as a trophy of their victory.

International shows 
Two international series were held in 1986 and 1987 between the British and New Zealand champions of the previous year. The first of these was held in Dunedin, New Zealand (the venue for the filming of the New Zealand domestic series); the second was held in Manchester, England. Each of these was a best of three series. Both series resulted in a win to the British team.

There was also a one-off match between the Australian and New Zealand champions in 1989, filmed immediately after the completion of the Australian filming in Hobart, Tasmania, resulting in an Australian win.

Results

Revived series, 2014–2017

Series 15
The fifteenth series was filmed on 1–5 July 2014 and premiered on 22 November 2014 on Prime. It was in a new round-robin format, hosted by Cue TV director Tom Conroy and produced by Sheree Carey. Auckland University of Technology, newcomers to the show, lost all seven of their round-robin games. The final episodes aired on 4 April 2015, with the University of Canterbury winning the series after defeating the University of Auckland in the final.

Episode list

Round-robin
The following table should be read vertically. A green cell indicates a win, and a red cell indicates a loss. The number in each cell shows the points differential (the difference between the two teams' points). Two points were awarded for each win. The four teams with the most points at the end of the tournament went through to the semi-finals. Total points differential (shown in the bottom row) was used as a secondary ranking criterion in case multiple teams had the same number of points.

Series 16
The sixteenth series was filmed in late August 2015 and premiered on 17 October 2015 on Prime. It was again hosted by Tom Conroy, and featured all eight of New Zealand's universities, which were split into two pools. Pool A consisted of Waikato and the three South Island teams (Canterbury, Lincoln, and Otago) and Pool B consisted of the remaining North Island teams (Auckland, AUT, Massey, and Victoria). The University of Auckland won the series, defeating the University of Canterbury in the final.

The first three rounds of the competition involved a round-robin within each of the pools. Round four consisted of cross-over games, where the first place team from Pool A played the fourth placed team from Pool B, the second from Pool A played the third from Pool B, and so on. At the end of round 4, the four teams with the most points went through to the semi-finals (with points differential as a secondary ranking criterion).

Episode list

Pool rounds
The following tables should be read vertically. A green cell indicates a win, and a red cell indicates a loss. The number in each cell shows the points differential (the difference between the two teams' points). For the inter-pool round, the opponent is written next to the differential score. Two points are awarded for each win. The two teams in each pool with the most points at the end of the tournament go through to the semi-finals. Total points differential (shown in the bottom row) is used as a secondary ranking criterion in case multiple teams have the same number of points.

Pool A

Pool B

Series 17
The seventeenth series premiered on 15 October 2016 on Prime. It was again hosted by Tom Conroy, and featured all eight of New Zealand's universities, which were split into two pools. Pool A consisted of AUT and the three South Island teams (Canterbury, Lincoln, and Otago) and Pool B consisted of the remaining North Island teams (Auckland, Massey, Victoria, and Waikato). The University of Canterbury won the series, defeating the University of Waikato in the final.

The first three rounds of the competition involved a round-robin within each of the pools. At the end of round 3, the four teams with the most points went through to the semi-finals (with points differential as a secondary ranking criterion).

Episode list

Pool rounds
The following tables should be read vertically. A green cell indicates a win, and a red cell indicates a loss. The number in each cell shows the points differential (the difference between the two teams' points). Two points are awarded for each win. The two teams in each pool with the most points at the end of the tournament go through to the semi-finals. Total points differential (shown in the bottom row) is used as a secondary ranking criterion in case multiple teams have the same number of points.

Pool A

Pool B

References

Notes

External links
University Challenge footage at NZ On Screen
Interview with participants in the final, Southland Times

1970s New Zealand television series
1980s New Zealand television series
2010s New Zealand television series
1976 New Zealand television series debuts
New Zealand game shows
Prime (New Zealand TV channel) original programming
Student quiz television series
Television shows funded by NZ on Air
TVNZ 1 original programming
TVNZ 2 original programming
New Zealand
New Zealand television series based on British television series
Television series revived after cancellation